John Dineen (born 21 December 1935) is a former  Australian rules footballer who played with Hawthorn in the Victorian Football League (VFL).

Notes

External links 

Living people
1935 births
Australian rules footballers from Victoria (Australia)
Hawthorn Football Club players